The Canímar Formation is a geologic formation in Cuba. It preserves fossils dating back to the Late Miocene to Pliocene period. Among others, fossils of megalodon have been found in the formation.

Fossil content 
 Carcharocles megalodon
 Euphylax domingensis

See also 
 List of fossiliferous stratigraphic units in Cuba

References

Further reading 
 
 M. Iturralde Vinent, G. Hubbell, and R. Rojas. 1996. Catalogue of Cuban fossil Elasmobranchii (Paleocene to Pliocene) and paleogeographic implications of their Lower to Middle Miocene occurrence. Boletín de la Sociedad Jamaicana de Geología 31:7-21
 C. E. Schweitzer, M. Iturralde Vinent, J. L. Hetler and J. Vélez Juarbe. 2006. Oligocene and Miocene decapods (Thalassinidea and Brachyura) from the Caribbean. Annals of Carnegie Museum 75(2):111-136

Geologic formations of Cuba
Neogene Cuba
Paleontology in Cuba
Shallow marine deposits
Formations